Rawreth is a village and civil parish in the District of Rochford, Essex, England. It is situated between Wickford and Rayleigh.

The place-name 'Rawreth' is first attested in the Pipe Rolls for 1177, where it appears as Raggerea. It appears as Ragherethe in the Feet of Fines for 1240, and as Raureth in the Charter Rolls of 1267. The name means 'herons' stream', as seen on the Village Sign (at right).

The area is mainly agricultural, sparsely populated, and with a small amount of industry.

Historically most of the farmhouses in Rawreth were moated manors, many of which survive today.

The original parish council was disbanded in the 1930s when the area was united with Rayleigh to form the original urban district. It was reformed in 1994 following the reorganisation of local government.

Governance
Rawreth is part of the electoral ward called Downhall and Rawreth. This ward stretches to and covers much of Rayleigh. The ward had a total population of 4,843 at the 2011 Census.

Geography
A stream linked to the River Crouch passes under Church Road near to Rawreth Equestrian Centre. It joins the river near to the A1245 (old A130).

Church
St Nicholas, Church Road.  Medieval in design, only the tower is an original of that era, the majority of the building rebuilt in late Victorian times.

School
St Nicholas Church of England Primary School closed at its original location and has relocated to a new building just a few metres over the civil parish boundary into Rayleigh.

Chichester Hotel
The Chichester Hotel is supposed to have derived its name from the Norman Knight, Sir John de Chichester, rumoured to have been the first occupant of Chichester Hall, a 13th-century moated farmhouse which still survives. However, during the 16th century the hall was the home of the Andrewes family, one of whom, Lancelot, became Bishop of Chichester (1605 - 1609), and it is more likely the hall was named by him for the eponymous city. In the early 18th century, the hall was home to Thomas Holt White FRS, brother of the celebrated naturalist Gilbert White. White raised the famous Chichester Elm cultivar from a tree which stood in the grounds.

References

External links

 Ordnance Survey get a Map

Rochford District
Villages in Essex